The 1965–66 Georgetown Hoyas men's basketball team represented Georgetown University during the 1965–66 NCAA University Division college basketball season. Tommy O'Keefe coached it in his sixth and final season as head coach. The team was an independent and played its home games at McDonough Gymnasium on the Georgetown campus in Washington, D.C. It finished with a record of 16-8 and no postseason play.

Season recap
In the previous season, Georgetown had started strong, raising hopes for a post-season tournament berth, but lost seven of its final 10 games to drop out of consideration for post-season play. This year, the Hoyas had a mediocre start, going 5-5 in their first ten games, but three of those losses came by a combined total of only six points. They began the new year of 1966 with eight straight wins by an average 17-point margin. During the streak, they won back-to-back victories of 103-74 over George Washington and 104-73 over New York University (NYU); the Hoyas would not have back-to-back 100-plus-point games again until December 2018. The winning streak pushed Georgetowns record to 13-5, and hopes of a post-season tournament berth were high.

Senior guard Jim Brown was a talented point guard who led the 1965-66 team to an average of 83.8 points scored per game, a Georgetown record that still stands. Brown scored in double figures in 17 of the seasons 24 games and led the team in scoring in four games. He shot 84% from the free-throw line, and had school records with 177 assists and 7.38 assists per game; the assists record stood for 14 years, and the assists-per-game record still stands.

Junior forward Steve Sullivan led the team in scoring and averaged 9.7 rebounds per game. He scored 30 points against Boston College, had 27 points and 18 rebounds against Fordham, and put in a 25-point performance in the Navy game.

Sophomore guard Dennis Cesar, a free-throw-shooting expert, joined the varsity team after a successful year on the freshman team the previous season. As a reserve, he came off the bench to score 21 points against Loyola early in the season. He became a starter in January 1966, and his per-game scoring average rose after that to 13.3 points. During the eight-game winning streak, he scored a combined 47 points in the two games against George Washington. Two of his free throws were key to Georgetowns upset of Rutgers, a big win in what turned out to the last game of the streak.

Sophomore guard Bruce Stinebrickner also arrived on the varsity after a year on the freshman team. He had turned down offers from 20 other schools, including Duke and Harvard, to attend Georgetown. He was an excellent defensive asset for the Hoyas, and also averaged 9.6 points per game.

Junior center Frank Hollendoner was limited by an eye injury and knee problems during the season. Nonetheless, he set a school record for points scored in a half by scoring 29 points in the first half against NYU. He finished the year averaging 11.4 points and 6.7 rebounds per game.

Senior forward Jim Barry – perhaps the greatest player of Georgetown mens basketballs "Classic Era" (1943-1972) – had missed the 1963-64 season while recovering from knee surgery. He had had a strong year in 1964-65, but knee problems returned to plague him this season. He played mostly as a reserve, but still averaged 11.7 points per game and had 22-point performances against both Loyola and Villanova. Senior forward John "Jake" Gibbons also played in a reserve role, but nonetheless averaged almost nine points and five rebounds a game and shot 48% from the field for the season.

The eight-game win streak ended when 13–5 Georgetown met eighth-ranked St. Joseph's (16–4) at the Palestra in Philadelphia, Pennsylvania. Both teams entered the game with postseason hopes, but the Hoyas had not beaten the Hawks since 1956, and they did not in this meeting; although St. Josephs led by only three points midway through the first half, they pulled away rapidly from there, leading by 20 points at the half on the way to a 111-73 victory over the Hoyas. The lopsided loss effectively ended the Hoyas' hopes for a postseason tournament bid and halted their momentum, and they lost their next two games as well. They recovered to win their final three games, with a 20-point effort by Dennis Cesar against Seton Hall, 22 points including the winning shot in the final seconds by Gibbons against Fairfield, and back-to-back 28-point performances by Hollendoner in the final two games of the season against Fairfield and Canisius, giving them 11 wins in their last 14 games of the year. Although they won more games than any other Georgetown team had since the 1946-47 season, their 16-8 record – the best record of O'Keefes six-year tenure as head coach – was not enough for them to receive an invitation to a post-season tournament in the wake of the blowout loss to St. Joseph's.

Although it had no post-season play, the class of 1966 finished with a record of 44-28 during its three varsity seasons combined. It was the first Georgetown class to post a winning record for its collegiate career since 1930.

Georgetown's head coaching position paid so little that O'Keefe could only serve as a part-time coach and held a full-time job outside of coaching in order to make ends meet, impairing his ability to recruit players. After the end of the season he resigned in order to devote himself full-time to his business concerns, prompting Georgetown to commit to hiring a full-time coach beginning with the following season. OKeefe departed with a winning record (82-60) and no sub-.500 performances by the team, but also without the Hoyas having appeared in the post-season during his six years as head coach.

The team was not ranked in the Top 20 in the Associated Press Poll or Coaches' Poll at any time.

Roster
From the 1958-59 season through the 1967-68 season, Georgetown players wore even-numbered jerseys for home games and odd-numbered ones for away games; for example, a player would wear No. 10 at home and No. 11 on the road. Players are listed below by the even numbers they wore at home.

Sources

1965–66 schedule and results

Sources

|-
!colspan=9 style="background:#002147; color:#8D817B;"| Regular Season

References

Georgetown Hoyas men's basketball seasons
Georgetown
Georgetown Hoyas men's basketball team
Georgetown Hoyas men's basketball team